was a Momoyama period Japanese courtier known as a poet, calligrapher, painter and diarist.  Having no legitimate son, he adopted his nephew Nobuhiro as his heir. Other names he is known by are Nobumoto (信基) and Nobusuke (信輔) in his early life, and Sanmyakuin (三藐院), his title in his late period.

In Japanese calligraphy he is distinguished as one of the Kan'ei Sanpitsu (寛永三筆) or "Three Brushes of the Kan'ei period", named in imitation of the Heian period Sanpitsu.

Family and early life 
He is a son of Konoe Sakihisa by a lady of waiting whose name is unknown. 1577 he held his genpuku and was named Nobumoto. Oda Nobunaga led the ceremony and gave one letter of his name 信 (Nobu) to the young noble. Later he changed his name Nobusuke. In 1580 he was appointed to naidaijin, in 1585 sadaijin respectively. He held the position of sadaijin until 1591. He was also the tutor of the noble lady, calligrapher and poet, Ono Otsu.

In 1585 he got into troubles with kanpaku Nijō Akizane in relation to Toyotomi Hideyoshi and his planned appointment to sadaijin, the position Nobusuke held at the time of the dispute, today known as kanpaku sōron (関白相論). The court meant to appoint Nobusuke to kanpaku succeeding to Nijō Akizane who had been appointed to this position this year. Generally this succession seemed inevitable but those two disagrees in details. Both issued their opinion of letters to the court and the dispute was not settled at the court. Then both visited Hideyoshi to justify each of their opinions. Consequently, Hideyoshi asked for kanpuku position instead of sadaijin which the court had originally meant to give him. For enabling this appointment, since only males of Sekke was considered to be eligible to kanpaku position, Hideyoshi also asked for adoption to Konoe Sakihisa, the father of Nobutada and the contemporary family head of the Konoe, with a promise that Nobusuke would succeed to Hideyoshi as kanpaku. This promise however didn't come true and Toyotomi Hidetsugu, a nephew of Hideyoshi was appointed to kanpaku in 1591. In this year in disappointment Nobutada resigned from sadaijin and entered into his retirement.

Late life 
In 1594 Nobutada got an anger of Emperor Go-Yōzei and was exiled to Bonotsu in Satsuma province, Kyūshū. He stayed there for three years. In September 1596 he received the imperial permission to return to Kyoto and held his sadaijin position again. In 1605 he was appointed to kanpaku finally.

References 
 The Calligrapher Konoe Nobutada: Reassessing the Influence of Aristocrats on the Art and Politics of Early Seventeenth-Century Japan, by Lee Bruschke-Johnson. Doctoral dissertation, 2002.
 Dismissed as Elegant Fossils: Konoe Nobutada and the Role of Aristocrats in Early Modern Japan, by Lee Bruschke-Johnson. Amsterdam: Hotei, 2004.

External links
Momoyama, Japanese Art in the Age of Grandeur, an exhibition catalog from The Metropolitan Museum of Art (fully available online as PDF), which contains material on Konoe Nobutada

1565 births
1614 deaths
Japanese calligraphers
Konoe family
Fujiwara clan
Japanese diarists
16th-century diarists
17th-century diarists